Refuge Walter-Bonatti is a mountain hut in the Val Ferret, in the Pennine Alps, Aosta Valley, Italy, at an altitude of . It is named after the Italian mountaineer.

References

Mountain huts in the Alps
Mountain huts in Italy